San Juan Sayultepec  is a town and municipality in Oaxaca in south-western Mexico. The municipality covers an area of 16.59 km2.  
It is part of the Nochixtlán District in the southeast of the Mixteca Region.

As of 2005, the municipality had a total population of 655.

References

Municipalities of Oaxaca